The 2nd constituency of the Ain is a French legislative constituency in the Ain département.

Members elected

Election results

2022

 
 
 
 
 
|-
| colspan="8" bgcolor="#E9E9E9"|
|-

2017

2012

|- style="background-color:#E9E9E9;text-align:center;"
! colspan="2" rowspan="2" style="text-align:left;" | Candidate
! rowspan="2" colspan="2" style="text-align:left;" | Party
! colspan="2" | 1st round
! colspan="2" | 2nd round
|- style="background-color:#E9E9E9;text-align:center;"
! width="75" | Votes
! width="30" | %
! width="75" | Votes
! width="30" | %
|-
| style="background-color:" |
| style="text-align:left;" | Charles de la Verpilliere
| style="text-align:left;" | Union for a Popular Movement
| UMP
| 
| 37.26%
| 
| 44.31%
|-
| style="background-color:" |
| style="text-align:left;" | Michel Raymond
| style="text-align:left;" | Miscellaneous Left
| DVG
| 
| 23.07%
| 
| 38.76%
|-
| style="background-color:" |
| style="text-align:left;" | Olivier Eyraud
| style="text-align:left;" | National Front
| FN
| 
| 21.12%
| 
| 16.93%
|-
| style="background-color:" |
| style="text-align:left;" | Paul Vernay
| style="text-align:left;" | The Greens
| VEC
| 
| 10.11%
| colspan="2" style="text-align:left;" |
|-
| style="background-color:" |
| style="text-align:left;" | Katie Philippe
| style="text-align:left;" | Left Front
| FG
| 
| 4.29%
| colspan="2" style="text-align:left;" |
|-
| style="background-color:" |
| style="text-align:left;" | Marie Jeanne Beguet
| style="text-align:left;" | 
| CEN
| 
| 2.75%
| colspan="2" style="text-align:left;" |
|-
| style="background-color:" |
| style="text-align:left;" | Claire Darmedru
| style="text-align:left;" | Ecologist
| ECO
| 
| 0.96%
| colspan="2" style="text-align:left;" |
|-
| style="background-color:" |
| style="text-align:left;" | Vincent Goutagny
| style="text-align:left;" | Far Left
| ExG
| 
| 0.43%
| colspan="2" style="text-align:left;" |
|-
| colspan="8" style="background-color:#E9E9E9;"|
|- style="font-weight:bold"
| colspan="4" style="text-align:left;" | Total
| 
| 100%
| 
| 100%
|-
| colspan="8" style="background-color:#E9E9E9;"|
|-
| colspan="4" style="text-align:left;" | Registered voters
| 
| style="background-color:#E9E9E9;"|
| 
| style="background-color:#E9E9E9;"|
|-
| colspan="4" style="text-align:left;" | Blank/Void ballots
| 
| 0.59%
| 
| 0.63%
|-
| colspan="4" style="text-align:left;" | Turnout
| 
| 59.88%
| 
| 58.59%
|-
| colspan="4" style="text-align:left;" | Abstentions
| 
| 40.12%
| 
| 41.41%
|-
| colspan="8" style="background-color:#E9E9E9;"|
|- style="font-weight:bold"
| colspan="6" style="text-align:left;" | Result
| colspan="2" style="background-color:" | UMP HOLD
|}

2007

Sources

 Official results of French elections from 1998: 

2